Sri Krishna Rayabaram (Telugu: శ్రీ కృష్ణ రాయబారం) is a popular Telugu drama written by Tirupati Venkata Kavulu in the early 20th century. It was made into a Telugu film in 1960. Many actors and companies have staged this production throughout Andhra Pradesh, India, and abroad.

Plot
The

Cal and lot is based on the story of Mahabharata, an ancient Sanskrit epic. Krishna acts as an emissary between Pandavas and Kauravas to prevent a war. The play opens with the Dvārakā scene, when Krishna is having a nap at his palace. Duryodhana and Arjuna arrive to seek his help in the impending war. Krishna puts himself on one side and his entire army on the other and asks Arjuna to choose first. He promises not to participate in the war himself. Arjuna responds by seeking Krishna's presence in the war as his charioteer. Duryodhana happily gets Krishna's army on his side.

Depictions on film

Sri Krishna Rayabaram was made as a Telugu film in 1960 by Y. V. Ramanujam under Chandrika Pictures. It starred Kalyanam Raghuramaiah, Puvvula Suri Babu, Gummadi, and Tadepalli Lakshmi Kanta Rao. P. Suri Babu rendered music for the film and rendered some poems.

Films such as Sri Krishna Pandaviyam and Daana Veera Soora Karna dramatised the Rayabaram scene, with the poems rendered by eminent playback singers like V. Ramakrishna. Ghantasala Venkateswara Rao rendered some of the songs for Telugu films.

Poems from the Rayabaram
 Chellio Chellako
 Alugataye Erumgani
 JandaPai KapiRaju
 Santoshambuna SandhiCheyudu
 Tammuni Kodukulu

References

External links
 Some of the poems of Rayabaram at Andhra Natakam

1960 plays
Indian plays
Works based on the Mahabharata
1960s Telugu-language films
Films based on the Mahabharata
Indian plays adapted into films
Plays based on myths and legends